The San Diego Civic Theatre is a 2,967-capacity performing arts venue located in downtown San Diego, California. It is the performing home of the San Diego Opera and hosts other entertainment such as concerts and musicals. The facility opened in 1965.

References

External links

Buildings and structures completed in 1965
Performing arts centers in California
Culture of San Diego
Buildings and structures in San Diego